Gumba may refer to:
Agumba people, an ethnic group who inhabited the plains of what is now central Kenya, but are now either extinct or assimilated
Gumba, Nepal, a village in Sindhupalchok District in the Bagmati Zone of central Nepal
Adamu Gumba (born 1948), Nigerian politician

See also
 Goomba (disambiguation)
 gompa, a Tibetan Buddhist building
 gumbo, a soup